Naseej is a Limited Liability Company (LLC) headquartered in Riyadh, Saudi Arabia providing IT solutions for libraries, knowledge centers and higher education in the Arab world. The company was founded in 1989 by Abduljabbar Al-Abduljabbar (currently CEO) and Abdullah Al Turaifi (currently VP) as one of the first providers of professional information resources to Middle Eastern universities and information centers. As of 2014 Naseej employed more than 350 mostly IT professionals and operated in 9 countries throughout the region.

History
Naseej (earlier known as Arabian Advanced Systems) began by providing universities and information centers with access to professional information resources, primarily in electronic form, through so-called "CD-Towers". These servers hosted multiple CDs in 1989. The company helped libraries transform from traditional paper-based card catalogs to electronic cataloging, using the Horizon Library Management System. The company launched the brand “Naseej®” in 1997 as the first of its kind to provide Internet access and web services in Saudi Arabia, and one of the first Arabic Internet portals. In 1998, Naseej became the first licensed Internet service provider (ISP) in Saudi Arabia. The ISP division of Naseej would later be part of a three-way merger with AwalNet (Alfaisaliah Group Internet service provider) and @Net (Alalamiah Internet service provider) to form the largest Internet service providers in the GCC (later acquired by Saudi Telecom Company).

Products
Naseej products include Campus Management Solutions, e-Learning Solutions, Enterprise Portal Solutions & e-Services, Knowledge & Information Resources, Library Management Solutions, RFID Technologies for Libraries, Digitization, Conversion & Cataloging Solutions, Museums & Archives Solutions, Enterprise Knowledge Management and Knowledge Consulting Services.

Partnership
Naseej partners with global companies including Bibliotheca , Saba, Desire2Learn, Ellucian, Book2net, Microsoft, Evisions, AgilePoint, Oracle, SirsiDynix, CISCO, ProQuest, Legamaster, Credo Reference, EXAM MASTER, IET, and IEEET.

References

Technology companies established in 1989
Information technology companies of Saudi Arabia
Companies based in Riyadh
Saudi Arabian companies established in 1989